The 2005 China Open was a professional ranking snooker tournament that took place from 26 March to 3 April 2005 at the Haidian Stadium in Beijing, China. It was the penultimate ranking event of the 2004–05 season, preceding the 2005 World Championship.

The event was last held in 2002, where Mark Williams won the tournament by defeating Anthony Hamilton 9–8.

Ding Junhui won in the final 9–5 against Stephen Hendry. Ding became the second youngest player after Ronnie O'Sullivan to capture a ranking title. Along with several other Chinese players, Ding gave up his normal tournament entry position in order to accept an offer to enter the tournament as a wild-card player and thus he did not receive either prize money or ranking points for his tournament win.

Prize fund
The breakdown of prize money for this year is shown below: 

Winner: £30,000
Runner-up: £15,000
Semi-final: £7,500
Quarter-final: £5,600
Last 16: £4,000
Last 32: £2,500
Last 48: £1,625
Last 64: £1,100

Stage one highest break: £500
Stage two highest break: £2,000

Stage one maximum break: £1,000
Stage two maximum break: £20,000

Wildcard round

Main draw

* Steve Davis conceded match due to illness

Final

Qualifying

Qualifying for the tournament took place at Pontin's in Prestatyn, Wales between January 25–28, 2005.

Century breaks

Qualifying stage centuries

139, 108  Anthony Hamilton
130, 117, 105  Robert Milkins
127, 101  Darren Morgan
125  Gerard Greene
120  Mark Davis
119  Neil Robertson
117  Tom Ford
114, 105, 102  Adrian Gunnell

112  Ali Carter
111  Sean O'Neill
108  Gary Wilkinson
105  Paul Davison
104, 101  Nigel Bond
103  Mike Hallett
100  Ryan Day

Televised stage centuries

 140  Paul Hunter
 139, 103  Michael Holt
 138, 113  John Higgins
 135, 129, 126, 117, 107  Ding Junhui
 135  Ricky Walden
 135  Stephen Lee
 134  Quinten Hann

 123  Kobkit Palajin
 122  Barry Pinches
 117, 114, 102, 101  Mark Williams
 114, 112, 109, 108  Stephen Hendry
 113  Ken Doherty
 104  Tom Ford

References

2005
China Open
Open (snooker)
Sports competitions in Beijing